Stephen Port (born 22 February 1975) is a British convicted serial rapist and serial killer. He is responsible for the murder of four men and for committing multiple rapes. Port received a life sentence with a whole life order on 25 November 2016, meaning he will never be released.

Early life 
Port was born in Southend-on-Sea, Essex. When he was a year old, his family moved to Dagenham in East London, where he grew up and where his parents still live. He was described as being a "loner" and was often bullied at school during his childhood. Former teachers also described Port's personality as "quiet". His neighbour described him as having a peculiar, childlike personality, exhibiting odd behaviour as a grown man, such as playing with children's toys. After leaving school, aged 16, he went to art college, but it proved too expensive for his parents and he spent two years training as a chef instead. A former romantic partner of Port's described his personality as childish and gave that as the reason for ending their relationship. He came out as gay in his mid-twenties.

He lived with his parents until his early thirties, then lived alone in a flat in Barking, London, and worked as a chef at a Stagecoach bus depot in West Ham. Port also briefly appeared on an episode of the television show MasterChef. He was described as having an athletic appearance at the time of the murders due to regularly going to the gym. He was bald, and disguised this in public by wearing a blonde toupée. The hairpiece was professionally fastened and increased his confidence when meeting other men.

Victims 
Port met his victims via online gay and bisexual social networks and dating or hookup apps, and constructed biographies in which he made false claims about his background, including one in which he pretended to have graduated from Oxford University and served in the Royal Navy. In another he gave his occupation as a special needs teacher. Port used gamma-hydroxybutyric acid (GHB), a date rape drug, adding it to drinks given to his victims, raping them, and murdering four of them in his flat in Barking. The prosecution said "postmortem examinations on the four young men who died revealed that each had died from a drug overdose featuring high levels of GHB", but Port surreptitiously used other drugs on his victims: amyl nitrite (poppers), Viagra, mephedrone, and methamphetamine (crystal meth).

Port contacted his first murder victim, Anthony Walgate, 23, a fashion student originally from Hull who, on occasion, worked as an escort, on 17 June 2014 pretending to be a client and offered £800 for his services; they later met at Barking station. At his flat, Port drugged Walgate with GHB and raped him; he died after Port gave him a fatal overdose of the drug. In the early morning of 19 June, Port dragged the body to the pavement outside his flat and used his own mobile phone to call an ambulance. Not giving his name, he told an operator that he had been driving past and had seen a "young boy" who was "collapsed or had had a seizure or was drunk" on the street. Port then returned to his flat. Shortly before 8:00a.m., Walgate was pronounced dead. Evidence linking Port to Walgate's death was missed at this time. Port was convicted of perverting the course of justice in March 2015 because his account of the death to the police varied. He was sentenced to eight months, but was released in June and was electronically tagged.

Between August 2014 and September 2015, Port murdered three more men: Gabriel Kovari, 22, who had moved to London from Slovakia, and had briefly lived with Port; Daniel Whitworth, 21, from Gravesend in Kent, who worked as a chef; and Jack Taylor, 25, who lived with his parents in Dagenham, and worked as a forklift truck driver. The bodies of the second and third victims were found in the graveyard of the church of St Margaret of Antioch in Barking, by the same woman on separate occasions walking her dog; the last victim was found in the park adjacent to the graveyard. Port had planted a fake suicide note alongside the body of Whitworth that suggested he was responsible for the death of Kovari, the previous victim, and that he had killed himself out of guilt.

Port used a number of Internet hook-up sites and apps as a means of initially contacting his victims, including Sleepyboy, Grindr, Hornet, Fitlads, Badoo, Gaydar, Flirt, DaddyHunt, PlanetRomeo, Manhunt, Slaveboys and CouchSurfing.

The families of the victims of Stephen Port were given compensation by the Metropolitan Police over the force's handling of the investigation into the killings. The Independent Office for Police Conduct (IOPC) re-investigated the Met over its initial handling of their cases.

Inquests 
The original inquests into the deaths returned open verdicts. Coroner Nadia Persaud said she had "some concerns surrounding Whitworth's death which have not been answered by the police investigation". Her statement continued: "most concerning are the findings by the pathologist of manual handling prior to his death" and noted that "the bed sheet that he was found wrapped in was not forensically analysed, and the bottle of GBL which was found near him was also not tested for fingerprints or DNA". A detective was asked why the bed sheet had not been tested.

Conviction and life sentence 
In 2015, Port was charged with four counts of murder and four of administering a poison but, at the Old Bailey in June 2016, prosecutors added six more counts of administering a poison, seven charges of rape and four of sexual assault. He also faced four alternative charges of manslaughter. Port appeared via videolink from HM Prison Belmarsh and denied all charges.

On 23 November 2016, Port was convicted of the assaults by penetration, rapes and murders of Anthony Walgate, 23, Gabriel Kovari, 22, Daniel Whitworth, 21, and Jack Taylor, 25, as well as the rapes of three other men he drugged, and ten counts of administering a substance with intent, and four sexual assaults. He was found guilty on all counts. In total, eleven men were known victims of Port's crimes.

Commenting on the case, Malcolm McHaffie, Deputy Chief Crown Prosecutor for CPS London, said:Over a period of three years the defendant committed a series of murders and serious sexual offences against young men. Port manipulated and controlled these men through the chilling and calculated use of the drug GHB, which he administered without their permission ... This was a technically challenging case, complicated by a significant amount of evidence taken from the numerous social media sites Port used.

At the Old Bailey on 25 November 2016, Mr Justice Openshaw sentenced Port to life imprisonment with a whole life order. Port is incarcerated in HMP Belmarsh. Port has subsequently maintained his innocence.

Questions about the police investigation 
The bodies of the four men were found in the vicinity of Port's flat, in a period of just over a year, from June 2014: Walgate (the first) outside his front door and the other three in or near a nearby graveyard. The Metropolitan Police, however, failed to link the deaths. The first three victims were initially thought not to have died in suspicious circumstances and, despite the PinkNews website and the force's LGBT independent advisory group correctly believing there was a serial murderer at large, the police had told them the crimes were not linked.

A BBC One documentary broadcast in March 2017 suggested a "catalogue of police failings" in the Met's response to the deaths. Crucial witnesses were not questioned; for example, Port's neighbour who had witnessed Port in a dazed state, with a large container full of white powder and bottles of clear liquid, when he made an unexpected visit to his home, and also reported receiving suspicious text messages from Port regarding Kovari.

Kovari's previous landlord, John Pape, searched on the internet for other unexplained deaths in the Barking area, and was astonished at the similarities in the case of Anthony Walgate, especially the locations in which the bodies were found; however, Barking & Dagenham Police did not link the two cases. Upon learning of Whitworth's death, he called the detective at Barking & Dagenham Police and demanded to know whether they thought the now three cases were linked or could be murder, as he was concerned for his own personal safety; he was assured that they were not linked and not being investigated as suspicious. He also offered to be interviewed since he felt he might have relevant information regarding Kovari's last movements, but no one contacted him in response, even after he had organisations such as PinkNews contact the police on his behalf. The woman who found Kovari's body and found Whitworth's body two weeks later in the same location and almost exactly the same position, also reported thinking that Barking & Dagenham Police "had no idea what they were doing" not to connect the two cases.

Whitworth's step-mother says that when police informed her of his death, they led her to believe he had overdosed on drugs, despite no investigation having taken place, and discounted the bruising under his arms which a coroner later stated meant that third-party involvement could not be ruled out. They took the supposed suicide note left with his body at face value, sending a small fragment to her and Whitworth's father, asking them to verify whether it was his handwriting. Although they said they were unsure, it was established at trial that Barking & Dagenham Police had recorded this as confirmation it was Whitworth's handwriting, and that the police had not submitted the note for expert analysis.

When the couple were later shown the complete document, Whitworth's father immediately commented that he saw nothing to indicate it had been written by his son. The couple had also asked whether the police had investigated who was meant by "the guy I was with last night", and that the response was that it would never be possible to find out all the answers. Asking about challenging the open verdict or continuing the investigation, his stepmother encountered what she described as an attitude of "it is what it is, deal with it".

Similarly, Taylor's sister reported the police simply telling the family "Jack's dead" and accepting the syringe in his pocket, white powder in his wallet and needle marks on his arm as indicating that he had sat down by himself and overdosed on drugs, although her brother was very anti-drugs. She and another sister contacted Barking & Dagenham Police 11 days after his death for an update on their investigation and were astonished to discover none was taking place. They then researched for themselves and came across the three previous cases, but the police responded by denying there was any connection.

Eventually, two weeks after his death, the police agreed to take the two sisters to where Taylor's body had been found and, at Barking Station, told them that CCTV footage of Taylor and another man had been found. The sisters were surprised not to have been notified, and more surprised to be told the police were not attempting to identify the other man. One described the attitude of the police as "shocking". In response to their questioning the credibility of the police account of what the footage showed, a sergeant later contacted them to say that, upon review, the footage did not show Taylor entering the churchyard alone. They then requested that images of the other man be made public in order to identify him; the police were reluctant, saying that they did not normally release CCTV images, but eventually gave in, and two days later Port was identified from the images and arrested.

Following Port's conviction, the Independent Police Complaints Commission opened an investigation into whether 17 police officers should face disciplinary action. , this was expected to be completed in Spring 2018, but not made public until after a verdict in a new joint inquest on all four deaths; the inquests on Kovari and Whitworth were later quashed. The families opened a civil claim against the Metropolitan Police, which was settled for undisclosed amounts in 2022.

The Metropolitan Police also reported in 2016 that they were re-examining 58 unexplained deaths involving date-rape drugs, although a spokeswoman said there was nothing to suggest that Port was linked to any of them.

Police identified Port as a "significant witness" subject to a rape allegation hours after his first victim was found dead.

In June 2022, the Independent Office of Police Conduct reopened investigations into the way the deaths were handled due to alleged "material flaws" in its previous investigation.

Port's GHB dealer 
In 2019, Gerald Matovu, who was known to have supplied Port with the GHB used in the killings, was arrested and later convicted of the murder of actor and businessman Eric Michels. He was sentenced to life imprisonment with a minimum term of 31 years. Using similar methods to Port, Matovu had targeted Michels on Grindr and had given him a fatal dose of GHB.

Aftermath 
In August 2018, it was revealed that Port had lodged an appeal against his murder convictions. In November 2018, it was announced that Port's appeal had been rejected.

In August 2020, in a Brazilian chat show programme, Que História é Essa, Porchat?, hosted by Fábio Porchat, an audience member named Rafael told his story of dating Port. Rafael had moved to London in 2012 at 19 years old, and had been working as a waiter when he met Port on a dating website. After they started dating, Rafael moved into Port's apartment, where they lived together for a little longer than a month. After they broke up, Rafael moved back to Brazil, where he got a different job and started another relationship. One day, he decided to search for Port's name online and found out about the murders through an article on BBC. Rafael said he first read the words “documentary”, “Stephen Port” and “serial killer”, and was interested since he thought Port had made a documentary on a serial killer, until he read it and realized what it was actually about. After he discovered the truth about Port, Rafael said that “looking back, there [were] a lot of strange things going on”. Another former partner of Port's also claimed to have broken up with Port due to his unusual behaviour.

In July 2020, it was announced that a fresh inquiry was set to take place in January 2021, to examine all four deaths and probe into any police failings.

Media 
In 2017, the BBC aired the documentary How Police Missed the Grindr Killer, which examined the botched investigation into Port's murders.

In January 2022, the BBC aired the drama thriller Four Lives, based on the investigation led by the families of Port's murder victims. The drama, written by Neil McKay and originally titled The Barking Murders, stars Stephen Merchant as Port, and Sheridan Smith and Jaime Winstone in supporting roles.

See also 
 Colin Norris – UK gay serial killer convicted in 2008
 List of prisoners with whole-life tariffs
 List of serial killers in the United Kingdom
 List of serial killers by number of victims
 List of serial rapists

References

External links
 R v Stephen Port Sentencing Remarks of Mr Justice Openshaw, Central Criminal Court, 25 November 2016

1975 births
21st-century English criminals
Criminals from Essex
Criminals from London
English chefs
English male criminals
English people convicted of rape
English prisoners sentenced to life imprisonment
English rapists
English serial killers
LGBT chefs
English gay men
Living people
Male serial killers
Murder in London
People from Dagenham
People from Southend-on-Sea
Poisoners
Prisoners sentenced to life imprisonment by England and Wales
Violence against gay men
Violence against men in the United Kingdom